Inkakai is a Finnish rock band founded in 2021 by singer/songwriter Caleb Daniel Lit. The band originally formed as Bleak in 1997, briefly performed as Flamer in 2009, and as Fireal from 2009 to 2021.

History

Bleak (1997–2009) 
Bleak was founded in 1997 in Rovaniemi by cousins guitarist Madu and singer Caleb together with local musicians. The band was active at the grassroots level and in 2005, they signed a recording contract with Helsinki Music Company. Bleak released one studio album, Burns Inside (2006). The band's first hit was the song "Fate", performed by Lit and Ana Johnsson for the Jade Warrior movie soundtrack, and co-written by Lit, Johnsson, and Tomi Malm. On January 19, 2007, "Fate" won the NRJ Radio Award for "Best Nordic Song". Bleak performed around Finland, including at Kokkola Rock Festival in 2007 and received regular radio play. Burns Inside peaked at #12 on the Finnish Top 50 Album Charts and stayed on for 8 weeks.

Members:

 Caleb - vocals
 Madu - guitar, vocals
 Crab - guitar
 Zeta - bass
 Junior - drums

Fireal (2009–2021) 
Bleak announced on their website that after 12 years, the band was breaking up due to internal and musical disagreements. In 2009, they began performing under the name Flamer and were the opening act for the band HIM at Helldone Festival. They later changed the name to Fireal. On September 9, 2009, Fireal released their first single titled: "The Imperial". In 2010 they released their video for "Halo"

Fireal's debut album The Dark Side was released on April 27, 2011, under the label Warner Music Finland. The album debuted at number 41 on Finland's official charts and was selected as YleX's Album of the Week. The song "Breathe" was composed together with Max Martin. The song "Ariel" was placed in rotation on Finnish radio station YleX and was voted as one of YleX's "most coveted" songs in 2011.

The band has cited musical influences such as grunge bands Alice in Chains and electronic groups The Prodigy. In interviews, they have pegged their musical style as "Imperial". Their style has also been called "cinematic", and they were featured in the movie soundtrack for Harjunpaa and the Priest of Evil. Additionally, the film includes footage of Fireal performing.

Fireal announced that in 2012, they would be taking a break from touring.

In 2019, Fireal returned from a seven-year break with a new single "The Smoke" and announced they were preparing a new album.

Members:

 Caleb Daniel Lit
 Teijo Jämsä
 Hepe (Antti Eräkangas)
 Waino (Tuomas Wäinölä)
 Jay (Jari Ilomäki)

Inkakai (2021–present) 
In 2021, after a lineup change, the band announced they were changing their name to Inkakai. The Japanese-American band members are anonymous and wear black katanas, masks and hooded clothing with red fire symbols. All this is done to represent the meaning of the new name 陰 火 会 INKAKAI (shadow, fire, society).

Keeping in line with the musical styles of previous bands Bleak and Fireal, Inkakai's style is described as “Imperial” or "Imperial Core" - alternative rock with influences of nu-metal and 80's to 90's electronic music.

The first single from the band was “The Smoke”. Previously recorded under Fireal and then re-released, "The Smoke" was one of the first songs the band ever wrote. Written in 1993 and then recorded as a demo 10 years later, it finally reached the studio and nearly became an album release in 2013. "The Smoke" has hit over a quarter of a million views on social media since its release.

In keeping members anonymous, Inkakai wanted to keep the focus on the musical group as one single entity or concept, rather than on individual band members and personal drama. Since their inception, they have always cited Star Wars and sci-fi as a huge artistic influence. The masks not only keep members anonymous, but also align with their core visual and musical vision.

Members (known only by their symbols):

 △ Voices, Strings, Keys
 ◻ Noises, Samples, Keys
 ○ Drums, Voices
 ◇ Base. Voices
 ● Strings, Voices
 ▮ Strings

Discography

Singles

Albums

References

External links 
 Official Fireal page in Facebook.com
 Fireal interview at Tampereen Klubi

Finnish musical groups
Musical groups established in 1997